is a Japanese writer from Fuefuki, Yamanashi.

Tsujimura specializes in mystery novels. She writes both for adults and children.

She has been writing mystery novels from since she was a high school student, and she decided to go to Chiba University  because there was a mystery research group in this university. She made her debut with her novel A school Frozen in time in 2004. 

Tsujimura is the winner of the 2018 Japan Booksellers' Award for her novel Lonely Castle in the Mirror. After being shortlisted several times for the Naoki Prize, she finally received the 2012 Naoki Prize for Kagi no nai Yume wo Miru (I Saw a Dream Without a Key)

She professes herself to be a fan of Doraemon and wrote the screenplay for the Doraemon movie  "Nobita no Getsumen Tansaki (Nobita's Lunar Exploration)"and its novel version in 2018.

Bibliography

References

1980 births
Living people
Japanese women novelists
Writers from Yamanashi Prefecture
21st-century Japanese women writers